Malaya Umrikhina is a rural locality in Starkovsky Selsoviet Rural Settlement, Oktyabrsky District, Kursk Oblast, Russia. Population:

Geography 
The village is located on the Sukhaya Rogozna River (a left tributary of the Rogozna in the Seym River basin), 80 km from the Russia–Ukraine border, 20 km north-west of Kursk, 15 km north-west of the district center – the urban-type settlement Pryamitsyno, 3 km from the selsoviet center – Starkovo.

 Climate
Malaya Umrikhina has a warm-summer humid continental climate (Dfb in the Köppen climate classification).

Transport 
Malaya Umrikhina is located 17 km from the federal route  Crimea Highway (a part of the European route ), 15 km from the road of regional importance  (Kursk – Lgov – Rylsk – border with Ukraine), 1.5 km from the road of intermunicipal significance  (Dyakonovo – Starkovo – Sokolovka), 17 km from the nearest railway halt 433 km (railway line Lgov I — Kursk).

The rural locality is situated 30 km from Kursk Vostochny Airport, 135 km from Belgorod International Airport and 233 km from Voronezh Peter the Great Airport.

References

Notes

Sources

Rural localities in Oktyabrsky District, Kursk Oblast